Nathan Kyamanywa (b. 1956) was an Anglican bishop in Uganda: he served as the Bishop of Bunyoro-Kitara from 2002 to 2014.

References

Uganda Christian University alumni
21st-century Anglican bishops in Uganda
Anglican bishops of Bunyoro-Kitara
1956 births
Living people